This list of France national football team records contains statistical accomplishments related to the France national football team, its players, and its managers. The France national team represents the nation of France in international football. It is fielded by the French Football Federation and competes as a member of UEFA.

Individual records

Player records 

Most appearancesHugo Lloris, 145, 19 November 2008 — 18 December 2022

 Other centurions
 Lilian Thuram, 142, 17 August 1994 — 13 June 2008
 Olivier Giroud, 120, 11 November 2011 — present
 Marcel Desailly, 116, 22 August 1993 — 17 June 2004
 Antoine Griezmann, 117, 5 March 2014 — present
 Zinedine Zidane, 108, 17 August 1994 — 9 July 2006
 Patrick Vieira, 107, 26 February 1997 — 2 June 2009
 Didier Deschamps, 103, 29 October 1989 — 2 September 2000

Most appearances as a captain Hugo Lloris, 121, 17 November 2010 — 18 December 2022

Most goals Olivier Giroud, 53, 2011 — present

Longest France career Karim Benzema, 15 years, 86 days, 28 March 2007 — 13 June 2022

Shortest France career Franck Jurietti, 5 seconds, 12 October 2005 v. Cyprus

Oldest player Larbi Ben Barek, 40 years and 150 days, 6 October 1954 v. West Germany

Youngest player Julien Verbrugghe, 16 years and 306 days, 1 November 1906 v. England Amateurs

Most appearances at the World Cup finals Hugo Lloris, 20, 11 June 2010 — 18 December 2022

Appearances at four World Cup final tournaments Thierry Henry, 1998, 2002, 2006, and 2010Hugo Lloris, 2010, 2014, 2018, and 2022

Most goals scored at the World Cup finals Just Fontaine, 13, 8 June 1958 — 28 June 1958

Youngest goalscorer at the World Cup finals Kylian Mbappé, 19 years and six months, 21 June 2018 v. Peru.

Most appearances at the European Championship finals Lilian Thuram, 16, 10 June 1996 — 13 June 2008

Appearances at four European Championship final tournaments Lilian Thuram, 1996, 2000, 2004, and 2008Hugo Lloris, 2008, 2012, 2016, and 2020

Most goals scored at the European Championship finals Michel Platini, 9, 12 June 1984 — 27 June 1984

Most appearances on aggregate at the World Cup and European Championship finals Lilian Thuram, 32, 10 June 1996 — 13 June 2008

Most appearances at the FIFA Confederations Cup finals Sylvain Wiltord, 10, 30 May 2001 — 29 June 2003
 Robert Pires, 10, 30 May 2001 — 29 June 2003

 Appearances in three different decades Julien Darui, 1930s, 1940s, 1950s
 Robert Jonquet, 1940s, 1950s, 1960s
 Henri Michel, 1960s, 1970s, 1980s
 Laurent Blanc, 1980s, 1990s, 2000s
 Didier Deschamps, 1980s, 1990s, 2000s
 Thierry Henry, 1990s, 2000s, 2010s
 Nicolas Anelka, 1990s, 2000s, 2010s
 Hugo Lloris, 2000s, 2010s, 2020s
 Steve Mandanda, 2000s, 2010s, 2020s
 Karim Benzema, 2000s, 2010s, 2020s

Manager records 
Most matches as coach Didier Deschamps, 139, 8 July 2012 — present

Most matches won as coach 89 by Didier Deschamps

Most matches drawn as coach 28 by Didier Deschamps

Most matches lost as coach 22 by Didier Deschamps

Team records 
Largest victory 10–0, France – Azerbaijan, 6 September 1995

Largest away victory 0–7, Cyprus – France, 11 October 1980

Largest defeat 17–1, Denmark – France, 22 October 1908

Largest home defeat 0–15, France – England Amateur, 1 November 1906

Most consecutive victories 13, 29 March 2003 — 18 February 2004

Most consecutive matches without a defeat 30, 16 February 1994 — 9 October 1996

Most consecutive defeats 12, 23 March 1908 — 23 March 1911

Most consecutive matches without a victory 15, 23 March 1908 — 30 April 1911

Longest period without conceding a goal 11 matches (1140 minutes), 29 June 2003 — 6 June 2004

Highest home attendance 80,051, France – Ukraine, 2 June 2007

Highest away attendance 125,631, Scotland – France, 27 April 1949

References

External links 
 FFF Official site

 
National association football team records and statistics